KOP Limited is a Singaporean holding company with business interests in real estate development, hospitality and entertainment. It has three wholly owned subsidiaries: KOP Properties, KOP Hospitality, and KOP Entertainment.

In May 2014, KOP Limited was listed on the Singapore Exchange Catalist board listing following a reverse takeover of Scorpio East by KOP Properties.
 
KOP Limited traces its roots to KOP Properties which was founded by current Executive Chairman and Executive Director, Ong Chih Ching.

KOP Properties is involved in the area of real estate development, investment and management services. Past property developments include The Ritz-Carlton Residences in Cairnhill, Singapore, Hamilton Scotts, 10 Trinity Square, Scotts Spazio, The Spazio. Current property developments include Montigo Resorts, Nongsa in Batam, Indonesia; Montigo Resorts, Seminyak in Bali, Indonesia; Prudential Tower in Singapore; Northernlight which includes Winterland in Shanghai, China; Fort Canning Centre in Singapore; and the Singapore Pinacothèque de Paris through its stake in Arts Heritage Singapore.

KOP Hospitality is the hospitality arm of KOP Limited and is in charge of the overall brand management and operation management of Montigo Resorts, Cranley Hotel, and Aqua Voyage.

KOP Entertainment was incorporated in Singapore as a wholly owned subsidiary of KOP Limited in July 2014. KOP Entertainment is involved in the distribution of theatrical films (movies) and home video entertainment (Blu-rays DVDs, DVDs and online), and organising concerts, musicals, shows and events.

History

2006–2010 

KOP Group, formerly KOP Capital, was founded in 2006. In 2007, it acquired sites for The Ritz-Carlton Residences in Cairnhill, Singapore and Hamilton Scotts, Singapore. It further commenced project planning and development of its first commercial project, Scotts Spazio and subsequently The Spazio.

In 2008, KOP Properties Private Limited was founded (“KOP Properties”) and it acquired the site for Montigo Resorts, Nongsa in Batam, Indonesia.

In 2009, KOP Group acquired Franklyn Hotels and Resorts, Luxury Lifestyle Hotels & Resorts and LUX Magazine.

2011–2015 

In 2011, KOP Properties acquired an interest in 10 Trinity Square in the United Kingdom which was subsequently divested in 2012. In the same year, KOP Properties acquired an interest in Cranley hotel under Franklyn Hotels and Resorts.

In 2013, KOP Properties acquired the Semara Resort in Seminyak, Bali to be renovated and renamed Montigo Resorts, Seminyak. In the same year, KOP Properties divested its interest in Hamilton Scotts. KOP Properties announced its plans for Northernlight with the first phase slated to open in 2018. Northernlight is a mix-use development comprising residential, commercial and entertainment components anchored by Winterland, the world's largest indoor ski and winter sports facility. KOP Properties announced its partnership with Pinacothèque de Paris to open the Singapore Pinacothèque de Paris at the Fort Canning Centre.

In 2014, KOP properties acquired Scorpio East in a reverse take-over to be listed on Singapore Catalist as KOP Limited. In the same year, KOP Limited led a consortium consisting of Lian Beng Group, Kim Seng Holdings, and Centurion Global to acquire a 92.8% interest in Prudential Tower for S$512 million. KOP Limited divested its 39.9% stake in The Ritz-Carlton Residences via the redemption of 2013 junior notes issued by Royce Properties, a wholly owned subsidiary of KOP Group.

In 2015, KOP Limited announced the official renovation and opening plans for the opening of Montigo Resorts, Seminyak.

Portfolio

Current property developments 
Montigo Resorts, Nongsa
Montigo Resorts, Seminyak
Singapore Pinacotheque de Paris 
Northernlight 
Prudential Tower

Past property developments 
The Ritz-Carlton Residences in Cairnhill, Singapore
Hamilton Scotts
10 Trinity Square
Scotts Spazio
The Spazio

Hospitality 
Montigo Resorts
Cranley Hotel
Aqua Voyage

See also
 List of companies of Singapore

References 

2014 establishments in Singapore
Companies listed on the Singapore Exchange
Holding companies established in 2014
Holding companies of Singapore
Real estate companies of Singapore
Hospitality companies of Singapore
Hotel chains in Singapore
Singaporean brands